Alida Geertruida "Lida" van der Anker-Doedens (28 July 1922 – 1 April 2014) was a Dutch sprint canoeist who competed in the late 1940s and early 1950s. Competing in two Summer Olympics, she won a silver medal in the K-1 500 m event at London in 1948. She was born in Rolde and died at 91 years in Haarlem.

References
Alida van der Anker-Doedens' profile at Sports Reference.com

1922 births
2014 deaths
Dutch female canoeists
Canoeists at the 1948 Summer Olympics
Canoeists at the 1952 Summer Olympics
Medalists at the 1948 Summer Olympics
Olympic canoeists of the Netherlands
Olympic medalists in canoeing
Olympic silver medalists for the Netherlands
People from Aa en Hunze
Sportspeople from Drenthe